is a passenger train station in the city of Chikusei, Ibaraki, Japan, operated by the third sector railway company Mooka Railway.

Lines
Orimoto Station is a station on the Mooka Line, and is located 4.6 rail kilometers from the terminus of the line at Shimodate Station.

Station layout
The station consists of two opposed side platforms connected to the station building by a level crossing. The station is unattended.

History
Orimoto Station opened on 1 April 1912.

Passenger statistics
In fiscal 2018, the station was used by an average of 19 passengers daily (boarding passengers only).

Surrounding area
 
Shimodate Orimoto Post Office

See also
 List of railway stations in Japan

References

External links

 Mooka Railway Station information 

Railway stations in Ibaraki Prefecture
Railway stations in Japan opened in 1912
Chikusei